Dmitry Anatolyevich Baga (born 4 January 1990) is a Belarusian professional footballer who plays for Dinamo Brest.

International career
Baga was a member of the Belarus U21 that finished in 3rd place at the 2011 UEFA European Under-21 Football Championship. He played in all five of the matches and scored in a group stage loss against Denmark. He also represented the Belarus Olympic team that participated in the 2012 Toulon Tournament. He competed at the 2012 Olympics for Belarus.  Baga earned his first cap for the senior national side of his country on 15 October 2013, in a friendly match against Japan.

He is a younger brother of Aleksey Baga, professional football coach and former player.

Honours
BATE Borisov
Belarusian Premier League champion: 2008, 2009, 2010, 2011, 2012, 2013, 2014, 2015, 2017, 2018
Belarusian Cup winner: 2009–10, 2014–15, 2019–20, 2020–21
Belarusian Super Cup winner: 2010, 2011, 2013, 2014, 2015

Gomel
Belarusian Cup winner: 2021–22

References

External links

1990 births
Living people
People from Barysaw
Sportspeople from Minsk Region
Belarusian footballers
Association football midfielders
Belarus international footballers
Olympic footballers of Belarus
Footballers at the 2012 Summer Olympics
Belarusian expatriate footballers
Expatriate footballers in Israel
Expatriate footballers in Greece
Expatriate footballers in Latvia
Belarusian expatriate sportspeople in Israel
Israeli Premier League players
Super League Greece players
FC BATE Borisov players
Hapoel Haifa F.C. players
Atromitos F.C. players
FK Liepāja players
FC Gomel players
FC Dynamo Brest players